KLRG (880 AM) is an American radio station broadcasting a classic rock format. It is licensed to Sheridan, Arkansas, and serves the Little Rock Metro area from its transmitter located 5 Miles from the Arkansas State Capitol. The station is owned by Charles and Devon Brentlinger, through licensee Broadcast Industry Group, LLC.

KLRG was formerly a gospel station owned by Joe Kinlow and Family until his death in 2015. Prior Formats include the Tan Talk Radio Network, and a Country Station KKDI owned by Cliff Packer from Benton, Arkansas.

The station was first licensed in 1982, and held the callsign KKDI. The station originally broadcast at 1540 kHz with a power of 250 watts, and operated during daytime hours only.

KLRG has separate transmitter sites for day/critical hours and night. It has been granted a U.S. Federal Communications Commission construction permit to move the night site to the day/critical hours site and decrease night power to 200 watts.

References

External links

Classic rock radio stations in the United States
LRG